On April 3, 2018, at approximately 12:46 p.m. PDT, a shooting occurred at the headquarters of the video-sharing website YouTube in San Bruno, California. The shooter was identified as 38-year-old Nasim Najafi Aghdam, who entered through an exterior parking garage, approached an outdoor patio, and opened fire with a Smith & Wesson 9 mm semi-automatic pistol. Aghdam wounded three people, one of them critically, before killing herself.

Shooting 
At 12:46 p.m., San Bruno police received reports of a shooter at the YouTube headquarters. Aghdam's weapon had a capacity of 10 rounds and she emptied one magazine before reloading. Helicopter footage later showed a large hole and broken glass in the building's lobby doors. A coroner's report found that Aghdam died of a self-inflicted gunshot to the heart, finding no evidence of drugs or alcohol in her system.

Perpetrator 
The perpetrator was identified by police as Nasim Najafi Aghdam (5 April 1979 – 3 April 2018), a vegan activist and fitness personality of Iranian-Azerbaijani heritage. She was born in Urmia, Iran, her parents immigrated to Iran from the Republic of Azerbaijan. She immigrated to the United States with her family in 1996. She was a registered member of the Baháʼí Faith and described how veganism was aligned with her religion, and was critical of Muslims and Baháʼís who ate animals. She lived with her grandmother in Riverside County, California. She posted content on Facebook, Instagram, Telegram and YouTube in Persian, Azerbaijani, English and Turkish. Her content went viral on Iranian social media and drew widespread attention. She had previously protested with People for the Ethical Treatment of Animals (PETA) against the use of pigs in United States Marine Corps training procedures for victims of trauma.

Nasim Aghdam purchased and registered a 9 mm Smith & Wesson semi-automatic pistol from The Gun Range San Diego, a gun dealer, on January 16, 2018. On March 31, 2018, Aghdam's family reported to the police that Nasim Aghdam was missing. According to her father, she "hated" YouTube, and the family was worried she might be traveling to the company's offices.

The officers did not identify her as a threat, and it is unclear whether these police officers were aware of the concerns of Aghdam's father. Aghdam visited a shooting range the day before the shooting.

Police believe Aghdam was motivated by perceived discrimination by YouTube towards her channels. She complained about the company on her website, writing that "Youtube filtered my channels to keep them from getting views!" and that the company had demonetized most of her videos.

Ismail Aghdam, her father, of Riverside County, said that his daughter was a "vegan activist and animal lover" who told him that YouTube had been censoring her videos and stopped paying her for her content. "She was angry," he said. According to the San Jose Mercury-News:[Nasim] Aghdam was prolific on social media, posting videos and photos on Instagram, Facebook, YouTube. Her YouTube channel included strange workout video clips, graphic anti-animal abuse videos and vegan cooking tutorials.

Victims 
San Francisco General Hospital and Stanford University Medical Center treated the victims. Four injuries were reported. The victims were a 36-year-old man in critical condition, a 32-year-old woman in fair condition, and a 27-year-old woman in stable condition. Another person injured her ankle while fleeing the building.

Reactions 
Then U.S. President Donald Trump was briefed on the shooting and tweeted, "Our thoughts and prayers are with everybody involved. Thank you to our phenomenal Law Enforcement Officers and First Responders that are currently on the scene." Other notable politicians who tweeted their condolences include Vice President Mike Pence, then Minority Leader of the United States House of Representatives Nancy Pelosi and California U.S. senator Dianne Feinstein.

Then YouTube CEO Susan Wojcicki wrote on Twitter: "There are no words to describe how horrible it was to have an active shooter @YouTube today. Our deepest gratitude to law enforcement & first responders for their rapid response. Our hearts go out to all those injured & impacted today. We will come together to heal as a family." Google CEO Sundar Pichai echoed these sentiments on Twitter, and sent an email to his employees describing the shooting as an "unimaginable tragedy" and a "horrific act of violence." Tim Cook and Jeff Bezos, the CEOs of Apple and Amazon respectively, also offered their condolences. Twitter CEO Jack Dorsey, Uber CEO Dara Khosrowshahi, and Box CEO Aaron Levie called for stricter gun control legislation.

The Baháʼí National Center condemned the shooting by Aghdam and extended condolences to individuals hurt by this event.

References

External links 

 Aghdam's homepage
 Internet Archive item containing Aghdam's dailymotion.com videos

2018 crimes in California
April 2018 crimes in the United States
Non-fatal shootings
Attacks in the United States in 2018
Attacks on buildings and structures in the United States
Crimes in the San Francisco Bay Area
Criticism of Google
History of San Mateo County, California
History of YouTube
San Bruno, California
Suicides by firearm in California
Workplace violence in the United States
YouTube controversies
2018 active shooter incidents in the United States